is a fictional character introduced in Sunrise's 1979 anime series Mobile Suit Gundam. Amuro is a mechanic who becomes the pilot of the mecha known as RX-78-2 Gundam to protect himself from the Zeon forces invading his space colony during the war. He becomes an Earth Federation pilot in the war as well as the first Newtype, a type of human with special awareness which gives him great skills when fighting. The Gundam franchise explores Amuro's involvement in the wars piloting the titular mecha. He returns in the sequel, Mobile Suit Zeta Gundam and the feature film Mobile Suit Gundam: Char's Counterattack where he takes part in new conflicts. 

He is voiced by Tōru Furuya (Japanese), Brad Swaile (English dub of the original TV series, Char's Counterattack, and the majority of the licensed Gundam video games), Michael Lindsay (English dub of Movies I-III), Matthew Erickson (English dub of Zeta Gundam and the Mobile Suit Gundam: Gundam vs. Zeta Gundam video game), Fryda Wolff (Young, English dub of Mobile Suit Gundam: The Origin) and Lucien Dodge (English dub of Mobile Suit Gundam: The Origin). His character became very popular in Japan, earning high ranks in popularity polls involving Gundam characters as well as anime characters in general. Critical reception to the character has also been positive with comments revolving around his work as a soldier.

Character background 
Amuro is the protagonist of the anime series Mobile Suit Gundam. He is the son of Tem Ray, the project leader for the Earth Federation's Project V, which produces the prototype mobile suits Gundam, Guncannon, and Guntank to combat the Principality of Zeon's Zaku. At the beginning of the Mobile Suit Gundam TV series, Amuro is merely a 15-year-old civilian, along with his friends Fraw Bow and Hayato Kobayashi, living in Side 7, one of the few space colonies untouched by the One Year War at the time. Amuro is a talented amateur mechanic, who spends a lot of time in building different mechanical parts with little social interactions with other people, and as a hobby designed the basketball-sized talking robot Haro.

Born on Earth in Prince Rupert, British Columbia, Canada, Amuro's early childhood was spent on the planet with his parents, Tem and Camaria Ray, until Amuro's father was called up by the EFSF to do weapon research under the guise of colony construction. Though Amuro's father wanted his mother to come with them, she declined (it was implied that she was having an affair at the time). When Amuro reunites with his mother during the One Year War there is some animosity between them, as Camaria could not tolerate her son taking part in the violence of a military life.

Once Amuro and his father made it to space, Tem was often not home for long periods of time. Amuro became a social misfit and kept to himself, spending most of his time at home building and repairing gadgets. His neighbor Fraw Bow took it upon herself to take care of him. This trend continued into the One Year War period.

Appearances

Mobile Suit Gundam 
Amuro's first appearance is in the television series Mobile Suit Gundam. When Char Aznable sends a group of Zeon mobile suits in a reconnaissance mission on Side 7, one of the new recruits from the squad decides to attack the colony. In sheer desperation, Amuro ends up piloting the RX-78-2 Gundam to defend his home. Using his intuition and reading the manual, Amuro manages to start up the Gundam and defeat the two attacking Zaku mobile suits. Seeing his potential, Earth Federation Captain Bright Noa assigns the reluctant Amuro to the Gundam and repeatedly sends the boy out against Zeon forces. It is in Earth orbit that Amuro first goes into personal battle against Char. Still being a novice, Amuro fares poorly, but still manages to fend off Char's attack. When White Base finally lands on Earth, Amuro deserts the ship after overhearing Bright discussing with Mirai Yashima about replacing Amuro from piloting the Gundam. Amuro abandons the crew with the Gundam, but after finding out about Zeon Ramba Ral's attempted attack on White Base, he rushes back to his friends and helps resolve the situation. During the Operation Odessa, the death of Matilda Ajan  causes him to realize he is not the only one affected by the war.

Across the war, Amuro first meets the Newtype girl Lalah Sune on the lakeside of Side 6, and immediately developed a bonding. Amuro and Char Aznable faced off several times during the course of the One Year War. He sensed Lalah's Newtype ability when fighting Char's Gelgoog in Side 5's Texas Colony. Their encounter ends tragically when Amuro accidentally kills Lalah when she blocks Amuro's critical strike towards Char with her MAN-08 Elmeth mobile armor. Amuro and Char's feelings resulting from this culminate in the battle of |A Baoa Qu where Amuro and Char destroy each other's mobile suit through fierce fighting, and then continued fighting with side arms and eventually a sword duel. Char eventually stops fighting and Amuro reunites with his crew members.

Zeta Gundam 
In the sequel Mobile Suit Zeta Gundam, Amuro is placed under house arrest shortly after the war due to the government's mistrust of Newtypes. While he lives in a luxurious mansion and is officially free to come and go as he pleases, Amuro's house servants are actually government agents assigned to keep track of his movements. Amuro works as a trainer/adviser in the Cheyenne Mobile Suit Academy up until the time of the Gryps Conflict. He suffers from chronic combat fatigue and is afraid of going to space and face Lalah's spirit.

During the Gryps Conflict, a pregnant Fraw Bow, with her three adopted children, come to visit Amuro. They manage to re-ignite Amuro's fighting spirit and help him escape from his government handlers. After joining the Karaba (AEUG's earth-bound ally), Amuro becomes a key figure within the group, leading several crucial missions, including the attack on the Titans' base in Mount Kilimanjaro and the seizing of Federation's Congress Building in Dakar. He later goes to space to fight the Neo Zeon. After the first Neo Zeon movement, Amuro joins the Earth Federation's Londo Bell group led by Bright Noa, and serves as the combat squad commander.

Char's Counterattack 
During the second Neo-Zeon movement depicted in the film Char's Counterattack, Amuro is assigned to the battleship Ra Cailum, Londo Bell's flagship, as the leader of the ship's mobile suit squads.  Amuro initially pilots the RGZ-91 Re-GZ, but despite managing to hold his fight against the funnel-equipped Char and Gyunei altogether (and critically damaging Gyunei's Jagd Doga), Amuro was unable to stop Neo-Zeon dropping Luna V on the Federation's Lhasa headquarters.  Traveling to the Moon, Anaheim Electronics soon delivers to him the RX-93 Nu Gundam, a highly advanced mobile suit largely designed by Amuro himself.  At Battle of Axis, after defeating Char's MSN-04 Sazabi in the duel and capturing Char's escape pod, Amuro attempts to single-handedly stop the asteroid from colliding with Earth by pushing it with his Nu Gundam. His action inspires other mobile suits to join in, even Neo-Zeon soldiers.  Although he eventually succeeds, the act overloads Nu Gundam's psychoframe construct. The fates of both Amuro and Char are not revealed in the film, although it is implied that both died in the occasion.

Other appearances

In Yoshiyuki Tomino's novelization of Gundam, Amuro is already a member from the Federation in the start. In this version Amuro is killed in the final attack against the Zeonic stronghold of A Baoa Qu when his RX-78-3 is pierced through the torso by a Rick Dom's beam bazooka. However, after his death, Amuro's consciousness communicates with Char's sister, Sayla Mass, and tells her she is not alone.  The first version of Char's Counterattack, High Streamer, follows Amuro's actions in his final fight against Char which were later adapted in the film. Tomino also wrote another novel titled Beltorchika's Children that had Amuro as a family man and reported as KIA in the ending.

Amuro only appears in cameo-form in Mobile Suit Gundam Unicorn, in the form of a photo portrait on the wall of the Captain Bright Noa's office on board his vessel, the Ra Cailum, as seen by Lt. Riddhe Marcenas, during OVA 4, "At the bottom of the gravity well". Although Amuro makes no other appearance in Mobile Suit Gundam Unicorn, he is referenced by several of its characters. The 2001 CGI short Green Divers, shows that Amuro fought in his own Zeta Gundam, marked by his signature "A" logo and painted in pure white with patches of bluish purple (arguably his signature custom colors akin to Char's red and pink) during the later stages of the Gryps Conflict and presumably during the first Neo Zeon movement.

In the final OVA for Mobile Suit Gundam Unicorn, the voice of Amuro can be heard as he speaks to Char as they depart along with Lalah Sune's spirit from the now dead body of Full Frontal.

Amuro also is said to have piloted an MSZ-006A1, the prototype in the Z Plus series mobile suits, but this was supposedly a marketing scheme by Anaheim Electronics to push sales of the MS line. Amuro piloting his own Zeta Gundam (especially in Episode 9 of Gundam Evolve) helps prove this, although one never knows. It is possible that he may have piloted a Z Plus during the first Neo Zeon movement, as it is never officially stated where he was or what he did during that particular time. Another episode of Gundam Evolve retcons an event from Char's Counterattack where Amuro confronts Char's underling Quess Paraya convincing her to stop fighting. He then convinces her to fly towards Hathaway Noa to save Hathaway.

Amuro also appears in the manga Mobile Suit Vs. Giant God of Legend: Gigantis' Counterattack where he joins forces with Char and Judau Ashta to stop the Neo Zeon from using the massive Gigantis to cause destruction. He is also the protagonist of the manga series Mobile Suit Gundam: The Origin which retells the events of the first Gundam TV series.

Amuro has made an appearance in the first episode ('AI Battlelogue') of the 2017 OVA Gundam Build Fighters: Battlogue, where he appears as a simulated copy in a Gunpla Battle duel against a copy of Char Aznable.

Amuro is also a recurring character in the Gundam video games. He is present in the Gundam crossovers series including Gundam: Battle Assault, Gundam vs., Dynasty Warriors: Gundam and SD Gundam.  He also appears in mecha crossover series including Super Robot Wars and Another Century's Episode.

Creation

Yoshiyuki Tomino gave the Gundam main character the name Amuro believing such word did not exist. However, three months after the show aired, Tomino received a letter from Sunrise informing him there was an island named Amuro in Okinawa. Amuro was introduced as an ordinary man in contrast to his rival Char Aznable. As a result, he found Amuro hard to write as he was meant to oppose Char whom Tomino found more interesting. 

Shin Sasaki from Sunrise considers the final scene from the Mobile Suit Gundam film trilogy where Amuro returns to White Base as one of the most memorable ones from the entire franchise. Toru Furuya also liked the scene where Amuro contacts his friends using his Newtype powers. Although Amuro was not his favorite character in his career, Furuya had fun in his work as during recordings of the series, he befriended Char's voice Actor, Shuichi Ikeda. However, he was not close to Tomino. Originally, Tomino did not want to include Amuro in Mobile Suit Zeta Gundam and when trying to kill him, he failed to do it. As a result, he decided to put Amuro on a friendly relationship with Char.

In further commentary, Furuya was glad with the popularity he achieved by voicing Amuro for over 40 years. He said that while Amuro also had popularity, he could not surpass his rival, Char, a common trait he sometimes find common in anime where there are rivalries. He further stated that "nowadays you can see the encouragement through SNS, I like how a lot of followers appear in Twitter, and I'm very surprised at his popularity" In regards to Char's Counterattack, Tomino created the movie to end Amuro and Char's rivalry. Kawai personally wanted the film to properly depict Amuro's mecha RX-78-02 Gundam in the same fashion as the original television series from 1978.

Characterization and themes

Amuro was announced by Tomino as a new type of being as reflected in how society needs this new type of human being. Tomino considered Amuro "kind of simple for the potential that human beings can reach in the future." Character designer Yoshikazu Yasuhiko stated that Amuro's misrelationship with the members of the crew of the White Base and his mother were outstanding by the time the series premiered in contrast to previous conventional heroes who would make up with each other. In one scene of an early episode, Amuro is slapped by Bright as a method of correction. Tomino considered this scene vital as he found this type of violence needed for a young person to mature most notably due to the way Amuro was misbehaving. 

Meanwhile, Amuro has a close relationship with Fraw Bow ever since childhood and remain friendly in the White Base. Yasuhiko had problems with Tomino's commentary about how these two characters do not end in a relationship. Instead, there is no further appeal between their relationship in Zeta Gundam where Amuro instead becomes more attracted to Sayla Mass, possibly due to her being his type of woman according to the staff.

Hideaki Anno, a fellow staff member who worked with Tomino several times, describes the Amuro from Zeta Gundam as a man who is ashamed of his actions in the first series and both he and Char see themselves in the new protagonist, Kamille Bidan, to the point the plot of the series came across as repetitive. Tomino responded to Anno that he aimed to give Amuro's and Char's characterization in Zeta Gundam ambiguous but stated that Kamille is too different from them to the point of labelling the new lead as autistic as a result of his heavy burden. When Kamille's first love is introduced, Tomino noted that they became more similar.

For Mobile Suit Gundam: Cucuruz Doan's Island Furuya (2022), Furuya found his work nostalgic and stated that the film made emphasis of how clashing was the relationship between Amuro and his superior, Captain Bright Noa. Furuya elaborated that Yasuhiko's idea was making the movie realistic with Amuro acting more mature in relationship with the children. Another theme of the film was how the youth's lives are being ruined by the plot of the One Year War story from the original television series. 

While the story was written to primarily centered around Char's hypocristic ideal, Amuro would oppose them. Nevertheless, Char provides Amuro with weaponry to support his Mobile Suit so that both would fight on equal terms. The intense exchanges between both of them are compared with Tomino's own feeling of being tired after working on several series.

Reception

Critical response
Amuro Ray's character has been well received by publications for anime and other media. John Oppliger from AnimeNation observes that the character of Amuro, to whom the young Japanese of that time could easily relate, made a major contribution to the series' popularity. While his character was early seen in the TV series as depressive and stoic, writers from Anime News Network noted how Amuro was developed in the series into a soldier as he faces the pressure of having enemies and the consequences of killing others. Additionally, J. Doyle Wallis from DVD Talk saw Amuro became more matured in the series' finale despite going through one stressing situation. However, Amuro has often been noted to be less popular than his rival Char Aznable. His appearances in Zeta Gundam were also praised by Mania Entertainment's Chris Beveridge for adding more material from the first Gundam series and for the change in several of his relationships most notably with Char. Allen Divers from Anime News Network found Amuro and Char's final duel the most important part from Char's Counterattack, the lack of resolution of their rivalry made the film unfulfilling. In reviewing the same film, THEM Anime Reviews' Carlo Ross saw that while Amuro was overshadowed by Char, he is still a "earnest, well-meaning, and heroic character in his own right." On the other hand, J. Doyle Wallis criticized their rivalry in the film considering it a "rehash" of the events of the television series.

Anime News Network praised the movie for the focus on Amuro's character arc and modern themes without removing the original aspects of the franchise. The Japan Times commented that every viewer would be concerned by Amuro's safety due to how the main plot has him surviving the encounter from the original TV series but still felt returning fans would enjoy the story and how the disciplinary actions performed in White Base are contested.

Popularity
Amuro has been popular, having been voted as the fourth most popular male character from the 1980s by Newtype readers. He was ranked second in Mania Entertainment's 10 Most Iconic Anime Heroes written by Thomas Zoth who commented that he "was the first teenage pilot with moral qualms about the war he was fighting. His arrogance, capriciousness and self-doubt paved the way for the isolated, troubled characters of Neon Genesis Evangelion." In the first two Animage Readers' Poll, Anime Grand Prix, from 1979 and 1980 Amuro was voted as the second most popular character in anime and was beaten by Char. He appeared again in the Anime Grand Prix from 1989 as the sixteenth most popular male anime character.  In an official Sunrise poll focused in the best team ups between former enemies, he and Char were first. In a NHK poll, he was voted as the third best Gundam character.

An EFSF military outfit was once used on a poster to encourage Japanese people to vote, and news articles refer it as the "Amuro style election poster", since the actor used is a stunt actor used in place of the voice actor of Amuro Ray. Amuro was recognized as a culturally significant subject by the nation of Japan on October 23, 2000, with the inclusion of the suit and of the main pilot on two stamps in the 20th Century Stamp Series. Amuro, along with five other notable mecha and pilots from the various Gundam series, were recognized in the second set of "Anime Heroes and Heroines" stamps, released in Japan in 2005. In an Anime!Anime! poll, Amuro and Quattro were voted as one of the best anime rivals turned into allies.

References

British Columbia in fiction
Prince Rupert, British Columbia
Fictional aviators
Fictional characters from British Columbia
Television characters introduced in 1979
Fictional ensigns
Fictional inventors
Fictional lieutenants
Fictional mechanics
Fictional soldiers
Gundam characters
Male characters in anime and manga